Joseph Roguet Aillet (born Joseph Fuourka, September 13, 1904 – December 28, 1971) was an American football and basketball coach and college athletics administrator. He served as the head football coach at Louisiana Tech University from 1940 to 1966, compiling a record of 151–86–8. Additionally, under Aillet, the Bulldogs won nine conference championships. He was inducted into the College Football Hall of Fame in 1989. Joe Aillet Stadium, the home of the Louisiana Tech football team, was dedicated in Aillet's honor in 1972.

Early life and education

Childhood
Aillet was brought in 1905 from the New York Foundling in New York City to Opelousas in St. Landry Parish, Louisiana, on an Orphan Train. Upon arriving at Youngsville on the orphan train, Father Johanni Roguet, the priest at St. Ann's Catholic Church, claimed the child. Since the priest could not legally adopt a child, he handed over the responsibilities of raising the baby to a widow named Eliza Aillet. From these two individuals, Joseph Fuourka was renamed Joseph Roguet Aillet.

Education
Aillet attended Holy Cross High School in New Orleans, where he played football, served as vice-president of the Class of 1921 and held leadership positions in nearly every school society. After graduating in 1921, he attended St. Edward's University in Austin, Texas. While at St. Edward's, Aillet played quarterback and participated in all other sports under coach Jack Meagher. He joined the coaching staff at Southwestern Louisiana Institute (now University of Louisiana at Lafayette) while he completed his work on a bachelor's degree in 1927. He then worked at Haynesville High School for nine years while he completed his master's degree from Louisiana State University.

Coaching

On the high school level, Aillet's teams at Haynesville won three championships during his 1927 to 1935 tenure. He was the first president of the Louisiana High School Coaches Association.

Aillet was backfield coach at Louisiana Normal for four years.

In addition to his success as a college football coach, Aillet obtained great success as the coach for the Louisiana Tech golf team. From 1952 to 1968, Louisiana Tech's golf team won the Gulf States Conference title 10 times in 15 seasons under Aillet.

Administration
Aillet was the first president of the Gulf States Conference. From 1940 to 1970, he was Louisiana Tech's athletic director.

Death
On December 28, 1971, Aillet died of cancer at age 67.

Recognition
Aillet is a member of the Louisiana Tech Athletic Hall of Fame, Louisiana Sports Hall of Fame, College Football Hall of Fame, and the NAIA Hall of Fame.

Head coaching record

Football

See also
Joe Aillet Stadium

References

External links
 
 

1904 births
1971 deaths
Louisiana Tech Bulldogs and Lady Techsters athletic directors
Louisiana Tech Bulldogs basketball coaches
Louisiana Tech Bulldogs football coaches
Northwestern State Demons football coaches
St. Edward's Crusaders football players
University of Louisiana at Lafayette alumni
College golf coaches in the United States
High school football coaches in Louisiana
College Football Hall of Fame inductees
Holy Cross High School, New Orleans alumni
Louisiana State University alumni
Sportspeople from Manhattan
People from Opelousas, Louisiana
Coaches of American football from Louisiana
Players of American football from New Orleans
Basketball coaches from Louisiana